The Greatest of All is a 2011 Italian comedy film directed by Carlo Virzì. It entered the competition at the 2011 Turin Film Festival.

Cast 
 Claudia Pandolfi: Sabrina Cenci
 Alessandro Roja: Loris Vanni
 Marco Cocci: Mao Maurilio Fantini
 Corrado Fortuna: Ludovico Reviglio
 Dario Cappanera: Rino Falorni
 Frankie hi-nrg mc: Saverio
 Baustelle: themselves
Irene Grandi: herself
 Litfiba : themselves
 Vasco Rossi: himself
Tre allegri ragazzi morti: themselves

See also   
 List of Italian films of 2011

References

External links

2011 films
Italian comedy films
2011 comedy films
2010s Italian films